Skene is the second largest town in Mark Municipality, Västra Götaland County, Sweden. The area has about 5,800 inhabitants and was formerly a locality of its own, but has grown together with Kinna.

Skene is the home of sports club Skene IF.

Notable natives
Björklund, Jan Swedish politician
Zackrisson, Hampus Swedish footballer

References 

Populated places in Västra Götaland County